Papillifera solida deburghiae is a subspecies of small, air-breathing land snail with a clausilium, a terrestrial pulmonate gastropod mollusk in the family Clausiliidae, the door snails.

Distribution
This species occurs on Sicily, Italy

References

 Bank, R. A.; Neubert, E. (2017). Checklist of the land and freshwater Gastropoda of Europe. Last update: July 16th, 2017

External links
 Paulucci, M. (1878). Matériaux pour servir à l'étude de la faune malacologique terrestre et fluviatile de l'Italie et de ses iles. Paris: Savy. 54 pp
 Papillifera deburghiae at AnimalBase

Clausiliidae
Gastropods described in 1878